African Anthropologist is the journal of the Pan African Anthropological Association (PAAA).

General information on online edition
Restricted access
Fulltext online:	vol. 6, no. 1 (1999) - vol. 2, no. 2 (2005)
Former title (until volume 6): African Anthropology

References

External links
 African Anthropologist at AJOL

African studies journals
English-language journals
Publications established in 2000